Krešimir Stanić (born 6 March 1985) is a retired Swiss footballer of Croatian descent. He spent his entire playing career as a forward for FC Zurich in the Swiss Super League. He was forced to retire in 2006 due to a serious leg injury that he sustained in a car crash. Following his retirement, Stanić, who was speeding and driving under the influence at the time of the crash, was a prominent safe driving campaigner in Zürich, but he lost his position after being caught speeding. He currently works as a youth coach at FC Zurich.

References

1985 births
Living people
Swiss men's footballers
Swiss people of Croatian descent
FC Zürich players
Association football forwards